Churton may refer to:

People
 Churton (surname)

Places
 Churton, Cheshire, a village in England
 Churton by Aldford, a parish containing part of the village
 Churton by Farndon, a parish containing part of the village
 Churton Heath, another parish in the area

See also
Churton Hall
Chirton